Episannina is a genus of moths in the family Sesiidae.

Species
Episannina albifrons (Hampson, 1910)
Episannina chalybea  Aurivillius, 1905
Episannina flavicincta  Hampson, 1919
Episannina lodimana (Strand, 1918)
Episannina modesta (Le Cerf, 1916)
Episannina perlucida (Le Cerf, 1911)
Episannina zygaenura  Meyrick, 1933

References

Sesiidae